Seager is a surname, and may refer to:

Alexandra Seager (1870–1950), businesswoman and philanthropist in South Australia
Allan Seager (1906–1968), American novelist and short-story writer
Charles Allen Seager (1872–1948), Anglican Bishop of Ontario
Christopher Seager (b. 1951), Zimbabwean cricketer
Corey Seager (b. 1994), American baseball player with the Texas Rangers
Edward Seager (1812–1883), British Army officer in the Crimean War and the Indian Mutiny
Gavin Seager (b. 1978), stock car racing driver
Henry Rogers Seager (1870-1930) - American economist
Kyle Seager (b. 1987), American baseball third baseman
Leighton Seager, 1st Baron Leighton of St Mellons (1896–1963), Welsh shipping magnate
Michael Seager (b. 1947), Zimbabwean cricketer
Ryan Seager (b. 1996), English professional footballer who plays as a forward
Samantha Seager (b. 1974), British actress in soap opera Coronation Street
Sara Seager (b. 1971), Canadian-American astronomer and planetary scientist and textbook writer
Sarah Seager (b. 1958), American conceptual artist
Spencer L. Seager, American Professor of Chemistry
William Henry Seager (1862–1941), Welsh shipping magnate and Liberal Party politician

See also
 Seagar
 Seeger
 Seger